The 2017 Pan American Judo Championships was held in Panama City, Panama from 28 to 29 April 2017.

Results

Men's events

Women's events

Medal table

Notes
A.Barrios and Rodríguez did not compete under the Venezuelan flag but under the International Judo Federation flag.

References

External links
 
 2017 Pan American Championships results
 Pan American Judo Confederation

2017
American Championships
Pan American Judo Championships
International sports competitions hosted by Panama